Butterfly is an extant 1924 American silent romantic drama film feature directed by Clarence Brown and starring Kenneth Harlan, Laura La Plante, and Norman Kerry. It was produced and distributed by Universal Pictures.

Cast

Preservation
A print of Butterfly is maintained in the UCLA Film and Television Archive.

References

External links

Butterfly lobby card cluster (archived)
Laura La Plante, Universal Weekly (archived)
#2 Laura La Plante, Universal Weekly (archived)

1924 films
American silent feature films
American black-and-white films
Lost American films
Films directed by Clarence Brown
Films based on American novels
Universal Pictures films
1920s American films